or Omi Shrine is a Jingū shinto shrine in Ōtsu, a city in Shiga Prefecture, Japan. It was constructed in 1940 and is dedicated to Emperor Tenji. It was formerly an imperial shrine of the first rank (官幣大社, kanpei taisha) in the Modern system of ranked Shinto Shrines.

The shrine is located near Ōmijingūmae Station.

History
The shrine is dedicated to Emperor Tenji (626-671), the 38th emperor of Japan. Emperor Tenji carried out the Taika Reforms and aimed to complete the reform in the capital city, which was located on the west bank of Lake Biwa. He moved the Japanese capital from Asuka to Ōtsu in 667. Emperor Tenji also presided over the establishment of the first rōkoku, or Japanese water clock system, which was installed in 671.

The proposal for this shrine to Emperor Tenji was first considered by Japanese Diet in 1908. The construction of the shrine started in 1937 and was finished by November 7, 1940.
   Beppyo shrines
Kanpei-taisha

Layout and design
The shrine is surrounded by a large forest. Its main  gate and buildings are painted red. The complex is located near the Otsu Palace.

Omi shrine pavilions were constructed by a method of Omi-zukuri, and it is listed in the Registered Tangible Cultural Properties of Japan.

There are a multitude of facilities within the precinct of the shrine, including Ichi-no-Torii (一の鳥居: First gate), Ni-no-Torii (二の鳥居: Second gate), Syagō Hyō (社号標: Stone pillar on which shrine name is engraved), Temizusha (手水舎: Purification font), Yuisho Kōsatsu (由緒高札: Official bulletin board about the origin), Rōmon (楼門: Tower gate), Ge-haiden (外拝殿: Outer Haiden), Nai-haiden (内拝殿: Inner Haiden), Honden (本殿: Main hall), Kaguraden (神座殿: Hall for a sacred symbol), Tokeikan Hobutsukan (時計館宝物館: Treasure hall of clock museum), Hidokei (日時計: a sun-dial), Rokoku (漏刻: water clock
), Kodai Hidokei (古代火時計: Ancient fire clock), Jidosya Kiyoharae-sho (自動車清祓所: Purification place for cars), Seishō Yōhaiden (栖松遙拝殿: The hall to worship kami from afar), Karuta gaku (かるた額: Frame for karuta), Haraedo (also known as 'harae-dokoro,' or 'harae-dono')(祓所: a site where harae is performed), Komorebi no Michi (木洩れ日の道: The road of sunlight filtering through trees
), Tokei Gakko (時計学校: The clock School), Omi Kangakukan (近江勧学館: Omi school), and Zen-an (善庵).

Monument status

National treasure of Japan
Search in the online database of the Agency for Cultural Affairs of Japan for country's designated cultural properties
 Sufukuji-tō-shinso-nōchihin (崇福寺塔心礎納置品) x1 set - deposited to Kyoto National Museum
 Shari (舎利) x3
 Shari container (舎利容器) x1
 Kinsen-hekiruritubo (金蓋碧瑠璃壺) x1
 Kinsei-Uchibako (金製内箱) x1
 Ginsei-Nakabako (銀製中箱) x1
 Kondo-Sotobako (金銅外箱) x1
 Ruri-Gyoku (瑠璃玉) x1 set
 Kōgyoku-Marutama (硬玉丸玉) x3
 Kondō-Haitekkyo (金銅背鉄鏡) x1
 Mumonginsen (無文銀銭) x11
 Suishō-ryu (水晶粒) x2
 Dōrei (銅鈴)（残欠共） x2
 Kinpaku-Moppen-Sonota-Hanshutsubutsu-Issai (金箔木片其他伴出物一切)

Important cultural properties of Japan
Search in the "Cultural Heritage Online" of the Agency for Cultural Affairs of Japan 
 Hakuji-Suichu (白磁水注／滋賀県大津市滋賀里町字勧学堂出土) - deposited to The Museum of Shiga Prefecture, Biwako-Bunkakan
 Shihonbokuga-tansai-tokakusansuizu (紙本墨画淡彩楼閣山水図)　Rokkyoku-Byōbu-Isso (六曲屏風一双)　by Soga Shōhaku - deposited to The Museum of Shiga Prefecture, Biwako-Bunkakan

Registered tangible cultural property of Japan
Search in the "Cultural Heritage Online" of the Agency for Cultural Affairs of Japan

Monuments inscribed with poems (tanka and haiku)
Poem monuments made by the carving of famous tanka and haiku on natural stone is known as kuhi (句碑) and kahi (歌碑), respectively. The Omi shrine has 13 poem monuments.

 (芭蕉 句碑) Kuhi inscribed with a Matsuo Bashō's haiku, "から崎の松は花より朧にて".
 (天智天皇 御製) Kahi inscribed with an Emperor Tenji's tanka, "秋の田の刈穂の庵の苫をあらみわが衣手は露にぬれつゝ".
 Kahi inscribed with a Tokitsune Yokoi (1st Guji)'s tanka, "歳神は今帰らすか左義長の青竹はぜて高く燃え立つ".
 Kahi inscribed with a Kanichi Hirata (2nd Guji)'s tanka, "比叡ヶ嶺に近く琵琶湖を目下に大神の辺に永世住まなむ".
 (香川進 歌碑) "Susumu Kagawaa: 湖ほとに息づき比そめと波はいひは留けく可奈志と波はまたいふ".
 (山村金三郎 歌碑) Kahi inscribed with a Kanesaburō Yamamura's tanka, "湖に音なき音を韻かせて比良ゆ流るる夕茜雲".
 (保田與重郎 歌碑) Kahi inscribed with a Yojurō Yasuda's tanka, "さざなみのしがの山路の春にまよひひとり眺めし花盛りかな".
 (春日真木子 歌碑) Kahi inscribed with a Makiko Kasuga's tanka, "人間の智恵のはじめよひそひそと秘色の水に刻まあたらし".
 (伊藤香舟女 句碑) Kuhi inscribed with Kashujo Itō's haiku, "楼門に湖脈打てる望の月".
 (桂樟蹊子 句碑) Kuhi inscribed with Shōkeishi Katsura's haiku, "漏刻の音とこしへに初日影".
 (高市黒人 歌碑) Kahi inscribed with a Takechi no Kurohito's tanka, "楽浪乃国都美神乃浦佐備而荒有京見者悲毛".
 (柿本人麻呂 歌碑) Kahi inscribed with a Kakinomoto no Hitomaro's tanka, "淡海乃海夕浪千鳥汝鳴者情毛思努爾古所念".
 (大友皇子御製 漢詩) Kahi inscribed with an Emperor Kōbun (Ootomo no Miko)'s Chinese poetry, "皇皇明日月と光り　帝徳天地に載す　三才並に泰昌　万国臣義を表す".

Omi Jingu Tokei Museum (Clock Museum)
In the precincts of this shrine, the Omi Jingu Clock Museum displays various clocks centering on roukoku and Japanese clocks.

Festivals and annual events

A Water Clock Festival, Rokoku-sai, held in honor of the first water clock in Japan installed at the shrine, takes place around June 9–10, the day when the water clock is thought to have been installed. The preceding day features a Japanese tea ceremony performed by the Sen Sōshitsu, grand tea master of the Urasenke, one of the three san-Senke.

The Japanese national championship competitive karuta tournament, Karuta Matsuri, takes place here every January, on the first Saturday and Sunday after the New Year holiday. The Grand Champions are awarded the title Meijin (men's division) and Queen (women's division), and a seven-time Grand Champion is known as an Eternal Master. The national championship for high school students is held every July. The tournaments take place here as Emperor Tenji composed the first poem of the Ogura Hyakunin Isshu poetry collection forming the basis of the game.

Another annual festival, Reisai, is held on 20 April, the anniversary of Otsu establishment as the capital during Emperor Tenji reign.

The list of annual celebrations and events
The following recurring events take place at the Omi Shrine:
 January 1 (from 0 a.m.): 
 January 1 (from 7 a.m.): 
 January 2 (from 8:30 a.m.): 
 January 2 (from 8:30 a.m.): 
 January 7 (from 9 a.m.): 
 January 10 (from 8:30 a.m.): 
 January 11: 
 January 12 (from 9 a.m.): 
 January 12–13: 
 January 15 (from 10 a.m.): 
 February 3 (from 10 a.m.): 
 February 11 (from 10 a.m.): 
 February 23 (from 9:30 a.m.): 
 March 1 (from 9 a.m.): 
 March 17 (from : 11 a.m.): 
 March 21: 
 April 19 (from 4 p.m.): 
 April 20: 
 April 20 (from 2 p.m.): 
 April 29 (from 9:30 a.m.): 
 May  (from 11 a.m.): 
 June 9 (from 10 a.m.): 
 June 10 (from 11 a.m.): 
 June 12 (from 4:30 a.m.): {{nihongo|'Raijin-sai''|雷神祭|"The festival to remember the punishment from the kami of thunder (Raijin) in 1975}}
 June (4th Sunday) (from 11 a.m.): 
 June 30 (from 11 a.m.): 
 July 7 (from 11 a.m.): 
 July 20–21: 
 July 30: {{nihongo|'|大祓式|"Grand purification rite"}}
 August 24 (from 11 a.m.): 
 August 24 (from 1 p.m.): 
 September 8 (from 3 p.m.): 
 September 15 (from 9:30 a.m.): 
 September 23: 
 October 17 (from 9:30 a.m.): 
 November 1 (from 12 p.m.): 
 November 3 (from 0:30 p.m.): 
 November 7 (from 11 a.m.): 
 December 1 (from 10 a.m.): 
 December 13: 
 December 20 (from 9:30 a.m.): 
 December 23 (from 10 a.m.): 
 December 31 (from 3:30 p.m.): 
 December 31: 
 on the 1st, 10th and 20th of the month (from : a.m.): 
 on the 1st of the month: 
 on the 27th of the month: 
 on the 28th of the month''':

References

External links

  Official homepage
  Introduction Video (Youtube) for Omi shrine made by Otsu tourism association

Shinto shrines in Shiga Prefecture
Jingū
1940 establishments in Japan
Buildings and structures in Ōtsu
Emperor Tenji
Religious buildings and structures completed in 1940